The 2012 Vuelta a Castilla y León was the 27th edition of the Vuelta a Castilla y León cycle race and was held on 13 April to 15 April 2012. The race started in Salamanca and finished in Segovia. The race was won by Javier Moreno.

General classification

References

Vuelta a Castilla y León
Vuelta a Castilla y León by year
2012 in Spanish sport